Lists of animated television series first aired in the 1970s organized by year:

List of animated television series of 1970
List of animated television series of 1971
List of animated television series of 1972
List of animated television series of 1973
List of animated television series of 1974
List of animated television series of 1975
List of animated television series of 1976
List of animated television series of 1977
List of animated television series of 1978
List of animated television series of 1979

1970s
1970s animated television series
1970s television-related lists